Yaña imlâ (Yaña imlâ: , , , lit. "New orthography") was a modified variant of Arabic script that was in use for the Tatar language between 1920–1927. The orthographical reform modified İske imlâ, abolishing excess Arabic letters, adding letters for short vowels e, ı, ö, o. Yaña imlâ made use of "Arabic Letter Low Alef"  to indicate vowel harmony. Arguably, Yaña imlâ had as its goal the accommodation of the alphabet to the actual Tatar pronunciation.

There were some projects that were to simplify Yaña imlâ too. The unique separated Arabic was  invented (so as to use typewriters). Separated Arabic was even incorporated in the early flag of Tatar ASSR, though it was not in real use.

As early as in 1924 the first projects of Latin script were introduced and in 1928 alphabet was switched to the Latin Yañalif alphabet.

See also
Tatar alphabet
Tatar language

Sources

Arabic alphabets
Tatar language
Alphabets used by Turkic languages
Writing systems introduced in 1920